Jornal Pequeno is a Brazilian newspaper. It is published in the Brazilian state of Maranhão. This newspaper says it is against corruption. "Jornal Pequeno" means "small newspaper" in Portuguese.

External links 
  (in Portuguese)

Portuguese-language newspapers
Newspapers published in Brazil
Publications with year of establishment missing